Kings Domain is an area of parklands in Melbourne, Victoria, Australia. It surrounds Government House Reserve, the home of the governors of Victoria, the Sidney Myer Music Bowl, and the Shrine Reserve incorporating the Shrine of Remembrance.

The park was established in 1854, extending the Domain Parklands further north-west, it covers an area of 36 hectares of lawns and pathways set among non-native and native Australian mature trees, a mixture of deciduous and evergreens. In the 19th century the Kings Domain was managed by the Director of the Botanic Gardens, so many of the trees were planted by Baron Ferdinand von Mueller and later by William Guilfoyle. Around the Domain are scattered memorial statues and sculptures, each with their own story.

Kings Domain is part of a larger group of parklands directly south-east of the city, between St. Kilda Road and the Yarra River known as the Domain Parklands, which includes;
The Royal Botanic Gardens
Kings Domain
 Alexandra Gardens
 Queen Victoria Gardens

Structures & other features

The Sidney Myer Music Bowl - a world standard, architecturally significant, tensile structure and outdoor performance venue. It was officially opened by Prime Minister Robert Menzies on 12 February 1959 with an audience of some 30,000 people, and has remained a popular location for Melburnians.
The Shrine of Remembrance is one of the largest war memorials in Australia. It was built as a memorial to the men and women of Victoria who died in World War I, but soon came to be seen as Australia's major memorial to all the 60,000 Australians who served in that war.
Governor La Trobe's Cottage is an historic cottage built in 1839 for the first superintendent of the Port Phillip District of New South Wales, Charles La Trobe, and his family. The cottage was constructed out of prefabricated materials imported from England on five hectares of land at Jolimont. It is one of the few surviving examples still standing of prefabricated houses from this period of history and gives an insight into early colonial domestic architecture and living arrangements. In 1963 the cottage was relocated to the Kings Domain as an historical landmark, and is now located backing on to Dallas Brooks Drive.
Government House, Melbourne is the office and official residence of the governor of Victoria. It has also been used as the official residence of the Governor-General of Australia from 1901 to 1930 and from 1934 has been used continuously as the residence of the governor of Victoria. Built between 1871 and 1876 in the Victorian Period Italianate style, it reflects the extravagant style of the period arising from a booming economy due to the Victorian gold rushes.
The Pioneer Women's Memorial Garden was designed by Hugh Linaker in tribute to the European pioneer women of the colony. It features a sunken garden area, with a blue-tiled grotto, which contains a small bronze figure of a woman. The garden was opened in 1935 during the centenary year of the founding of Melbourne.
The Kings Domain Resting Place is a memorial for the remains of Indigenous People marked by a granite burial rock honouring the Aboriginal People of Victoria, including the local Wurundjeri. The skeletal remains of 38 Aboriginal People are buried here, after they were handed over to the Aboriginal Community in 1985 by the Melbourne Museum after the Koorie Heritage Trust proposed legal action.

A memorial to Sir John Monash, as Commander in Chief of the Australian Forces during World War I, is commemorated in a bronze equestrian statue created by William Leslie Bowles. It was unveiled by the Governor-General, William McKell, on 12 November 1950.
An interactive sculpture consisting of three bronze bells commemorates the life of Tilly Aston, a blind disability activist who founded the Victorian Association of Braille Writers, and later went on to establish the Association for the Advancement of the Blind. On the sculpture there is an embedded image of Tilly Aston with text in embossed lettering and in braille. The memorial was created by Anton Hasell in 1999.
A memorial statue of Sir Thomas Blamey stands on the corner of Government House Drive and Birdwood Avenue. It was sculptured from granite and bronze by Raymond B. Ewers and presented to the city in February 1960. It recognises Australia's first Field Marshal and his insistence to the British command that Australian forces remain as cohesive units under Australian command.
South African War Memorial (Memorial to Fallen Soldiers). A central obelisk with a lion on each of four corners is the memorial for the Australians who died in the South African War of 1899–1902 (Boer War) Sculptored by J. Hamilton and erected in 1904 with members of the fifth Victorian Contingent Victorian Mounted Rifles.
The Walker Fountain was donated by Ron Walker, Lord Mayor of Melbourne in 1981. It is located on Linlithgow Avenue and consists of a small lake with hundreds of streams of water, including underwater lights.
A statue of Sir Edward "Weary" Dunlop is made from bronze, granite and metal spikes from the Burma-Thailand Railway in 1995 by Peter Corlett. Weary Dunlop was known as a courageous leader and compassionate doctor and showed great leadership while serving as prisoner of war in Changi Prison and on the Burma-Thailand Railway during World War 2. On the steps leading to the sculpture are the names of other doctors who were also POWs at Changi.
English Nurse Edith Cavell is remembered in Melbourne with a marble bust erected by public subscription. Cavell helped English and French prisoners escape from Belgium during World War I, and was tried by the Germans and executed on 12 October 1915. The bust was sculpted by Margaret Baskerville and unveiled in 1926.
Facing St Kilda Road near the entry to Government House Drive stands a bronze equestrian statue of Lord Hopetoun, more properly called John Hope, 1st Marquess of Linlithgow, the first Governor-General of Australia. The statue is a result of a public subscription and was unveiled on 15 June 1911, by his Excellency Sir John Fuller, accompanied by Prime Minister, Billy Hughes.

The King George V Memorial was created by William Leslie Bowles after a public meeting on 6 February 1937 decided to erect a memorial for the late King and launched a public appeal. Construction of the bronze, granite and sandstone sculpture was delayed by World War 2 and was completed in 1951.
 A plaque to commemorate Edward George Honey, located on Birdwood Avenue. Honey was a Melbourne-born journalist who campaigned for, and was one of those instrumental in, the adoption of the Two-minute silence on Armistice Day to pause and reflect on those who have lost their lives in war.
The Australian Turkish Friendship Memorial commissioned by the Victorian RSL's Turkish Sub-branch honours WWI fallen soldiers and is a tribute to Australian-Turkish relations.
Native Animals: Many native animals live in and visit King's Domain - Brush-tailed and Ring-tailed possums, Tawny Frogmouths, Magpies, Gould's wattled bats, Eastern Freetailed bats and Grey headed flying foxes, Native water rats (Rakali), Kookaburras and several varieties of waterbirds.

References

 Victorian Heritage List Statement of Significance
 Kings Domain Melbourne City Council webpage

External links

The Age story on the protest
 Wikinews coverage of the protest

Tourist attractions in Melbourne
Parks in Melbourne
Landmarks in Melbourne